St. John's University CDP, Minnesota is a census-designated place (CDP) covering the St. John's University campus in Collegeville Township, Stearns County, Minnesota, United States. 

It first appeared as a CDP in the 2020 Census with a population of 1,585.

Education
The CDP is in the St. Cloud Area School District.

The CDP is zoned to Kennedy Community School (PK-8), and Apollo High School.

Demographics

2020 census

Note: the US Census treats Hispanic/Latino as an ethnic category. This table excludes Latinos from the racial categories and assigns them to a separate category. Hispanics/Latinos can be of any race.

References

Census-designated places in Stearns County, Minnesota